Charles Jacobus (May 1, 1840 – November 24, 1922) was an American roque player who competed in the 1904 Summer Olympics in St. Louis. In 1904 he won the gold medal in the Olympic roque tournament.

References

External links

 
Charles Jacobus' profile at Sports Reference.com

1840 births
1922 deaths
American roque players
Olympic gold medalists for the United States
Olympic roque players of the United States
Roque players at the 1904 Summer Olympics
Medalists at the 1904 Summer Olympics